Haywood Patrick Swygert (born March 17, 1943) was the president of Howard University in Washington, D.C., from 1995 until 2008.

Career 
He is a graduate of South Philadelphia High School and has been inducted into the SPHS Alumni Cultural Hall of Fame.  Swygert graduated from Howard University in 1965, the same year President Lyndon B. Johnson delivered his historic speech to the graduating class. He later received a J.D. degree from Howard University Law School.

Swygert was president of the State University of New York at Albany from 1990 to 1995 and previously served as executive vice president of Temple University, where he was also a professor of law in the Temple University School of Law.

He is a law professor, member of the Commission on Presidential Elections, Alpha Phi Omega National Service Fraternity, Zeta Phi chapter and Omega Psi Phi, Alpha chapter.  Swygert resigned as president of Howard University effective June 30, 2008 although he remained active on campus as a professor and fundraiser.

References 

1943 births
Howard University alumni
Howard University School of Law alumni
Presidents of Howard University
Living people
Educators from Philadelphia
Temple University faculty
Presidents of University at Albany
African-American academics
American academic administrators
African-American educators
21st-century African-American people
20th-century African-American people
South Philadelphia High School alumni